The Alliance of Patriotic Forces (APG) was a political party in Guinea-Bissau.

History
The party was established by Fernando Gomes in 2000. In 2004 it joined the United People's Alliance in order to contest the March 2004 parliamentary elections. The Alliance received 1.36% of the vote and won a single seat, taken by Gomes.

The United People's Alliance was dissolved by the end of 2004, and Gomes left the APG to join the African Party for the Independence of Guinea and Cape Verde.

The ASG supported the 2012 military coup.

References

Political parties established in 2000
Defunct political parties in Guinea-Bissau
2000 establishments in Guinea-Bissau